Thunder Bay—Superior North is a provincial electoral district in Ontario, Canada, that has been represented in the Legislative Assembly of Ontario since 1999.

The district is in the northwestern part of the province of Ontario.

It consists of the eastern part of the Territorial District of Thunder Bay including the northern part of the city of Thunder Bay, Ontario.

The current Member of Provincial Parliament for this riding is Lise Vaugeois from the Ontario New Democratic Party.

Geography

Thunder Bay—Superior North consists of the part of the Territorial District of Thunder Bay 
lying east of a line drawn from the northern limit the territorial district due south to the northeast corner of the Township of Bulmer, and south along the eastern boundaries of the townships of Bulmer, Fletcher, Furlonge, McLaurin and Bertrand, east along the 6th Base Line, south along longitude 90o00( W, Dog River and the western shoreline of Dog Lake, west, along the north, west and south boundaries of the Township of Fowler, south along the Kaministiquia River, east along the northern limit of the Township of Oliver Paipoonge, south along its eastern limit and along Pole Line Road, north along Thunder Bay Expressway (Highways 11 and 17), east along Harbour Expressway and Main Street to 110th Avenue, then due east to the eastern limit of the City of Thunder Bay, along that limit to the northeast corner of the Township of Neebing, then southeast to the US border;  and
 excluding the part lying south and east of a line drawn from the southwest corner of the Township of Downer due west to a line drawn due south from the southeast corner of the Township of Bain, due south to a line drawn due west from the southwest corner of the Township of McGill, due east to longitude 86o00( W, south along that longitude, and west along the White River to Lake Superior.

History
The district was created from Port Arthur and Lake Nipigon in 1999 when Ontario was divided into the same electoral districts as those used for federal electoral purposes. They were redistributed whenever a readjustment took place at the federal level.

In 2005, legislation was passed by the Legislature to divide Ontario into 107 electoral districts, beginning with the next provincial election in 2007. The eleven northern electoral districts are those defined for federal purposes in 1996, based on the 1991 census (except for a minor boundary adjustment). The 96 southern electoral districts are those defined for federal electoral purposes in 2003, based on the 2001 census. Without this legislation, the number of electoral districts in northern Ontario would have been reduced from eleven to ten.

Members

Election results

2007 electoral reform referendum

Notes

Sources
 Elections Ontario Results:
1999 results
2003 results
2007 results
Map of riding for 2018 election

Ontario provincial electoral districts
Politics of Thunder Bay